The 2013–14 season was Olympique de Marseille's 108th season in existence and the club's 18th consecutive season in the top flight of French football, Ligue 1, where they finished 6th. Marseille also participated in the Coupe de France and the Coupe de la Ligue, where they were eliminated in the round of 32 and quarter-finals respectively. They also participated in the UEFA Champions League, where they were eliminated in the group stage.

Players

French teams are limited to four players without EU citizenship. Hence, the squad list includes only the principal nationality of each player; several non-European players on the squad have dual citizenship with an EU country. Also, players from the ACP countries—countries in Africa, the Caribbean, and the Pacific that are signatories to the Cotonou Agreement—are not counted against non-EU quotas due to the Kolpak ruling.

Current squad

Out on loan

Reserve squad

Competitions

Ligue 1

League table

Results summary

Results by round

Matches

Coupe de France

Coupe de la Ligue

UEFA Champions League

Group stage

References 

Olympique de Marseille seasons
Marseille
Olympique de Marseille